Havana is an unincorporated community in Umatilla County, Oregon, United States,  northeast of Pendleton on Wildhorse Creek. This former Union Pacific Railroad station is near the junction of Oregon Route 335, known as the Havana–Helix Highway, with Oregon Route 11, about 9 miles south of Helix. Its elevation is 1312 ft (400 m) above sea level.

References

External links
1950s images of the McCormmach Ranch in the Havana area from Oregon State University Extension Service, Umatilla County

Unincorporated communities in Umatilla County, Oregon
Unincorporated communities in Oregon